A by-election was held for the United Kingdom House of Commons for one Member of Parliament (MP) in the constituency of Bradford North, in West Yorkshire, England, on 8 November 1990 owing to the death of the sitting MP Pat Wall.

Bradford is a city based on heavy engineering and textile industries. The Bradford North seat had been held for one Parliament by the Conservatives from 1983 to 1987, when the Labour candidate Pat Wall (a member of the Militant tendency) saw his vote split by a strong SDP challenge and by the sitting Labour MP Ben Ford standing as an Independent. (The successful Conservative, Geoffrey Lawler, had only 34.6% of the vote.)

The byelection took place when Margaret Thatcher was highly unpopular and in her last month as Prime Minister. Declining support for the Conservative government (which improved after John Major succeeded Thatcher near the end of November 1990) was reflected by the fact that the Conservative candidate in this by-election only attracted just over one in six of the total votes cast.

The successful Labour candidate Terry Rooney became the first Mormon to be elected to the House of Commons.

See also
 List of United Kingdom by-elections
 List of parliamentary constituencies in West Yorkshire

References

External links
British Parliamentary By Elections: Campaign literature from the by-election

Bradford North by-election
By-elections to the Parliament of the United Kingdom in Bradford constituencies
Bradford North by-election
Bradford North by-election
1990s in West Yorkshire